Gingur (also Romanized as Gīngūr) is a village in Chaybasar-e Sharqi Rural District, in the Central District of Poldasht County, West Azerbaijan Province, Iran. At the 2006 census, its population was 498, in 87 families.

References 

Populated places in Poldasht County